NeXTSTEP is a discontinued object-oriented, multitasking operating system based on the Mach kernel and the UNIX-derived BSD. It was developed by NeXT Computer in the late 1980s and early 1990s and was initially used for its range of proprietary workstation computers such as the NeXTcube. It was later ported to several other computer architectures.

Although relatively unsuccessful at the time, it attracted interest from computer scientists and researchers. It hosted the original development of the Electronic AppWrapper, the first commercial electronic software distribution catalog to collectively manage encryption and provide digital rights for application software and digital media, a forerunner of the modern "app store" concept. It is the platform on which Tim Berners-Lee created the first web browser, and on which id Software developed the video games Doom and Quake.

In 1996, NeXT was acquired by Apple Computer to succeed the classic Mac OS, by merging NeXTSTEP and OpenStep with Apple's user environment to become Mac OS X, renamed macOS. This powers all of Apple's platforms, including iOS.

Overview
NeXTSTEP (also stylized as NeXTstep, NeXTStep, and NEXTSTEP) is a combination of several parts:
 a Unix operating system based on the Mach kernel, plus BSD
 Display PostScript and a proprietary windowing engine
 the Objective-C language and runtime
 an object-oriented (OO) application layer, including several "kits"
 development tools for the OO layers.

NeXTSTEP is a preeminent implementation of the last three items. The toolkits are the canonical development system for all of the software on the system.

It introduced the idea of the Dock (carried through OpenStep and into macOS) and the Shelf. NeXTSTEP originated or innovated a large number of other GUI concepts which became common in other operating systems: 3D chiseled widgets, large full-color icons, system-wide drag and drop of a wide range of objects beyond file icons, system-wide piped services, real-time scrolling and window dragging, properties dialog boxes called "inspectors", and window modification notices (such as the saved status of a file). The system is among the first general-purpose user interfaces to handle publishing color standards, transparency, sophisticated sound and music processing (through a Motorola 56000 DSP), advanced graphics primitives, internationalization, and modern typography, in a consistent manner across all applications.

Additional kits were added to the product line. These include Portable Distributed Objects (PDO), which allow easy remote invocation, and Enterprise Objects Framework, an object-relational database system. The kits made the system particularly interesting to custom application programmers, and NeXTSTEP had a long history in the financial programming community.

History
NeXTSTEP was built upon Mach and BSD, initially 4.3BSD-Tahoe. A preview release of NeXTSTEP (version 0.8) was shown with the launch of the NeXT Computer on October 12, 1988. The first full release, NeXTSTEP 1.0, shipped on September 18, 1989. It was updated to 4.3BSD-Reno in NeXTSTEP 3.0. The last version, 3.3, was released in early 1995, for the Motorola 68000 family based NeXT computers, Intel x86, Sun SPARC, and HP PA-RISC-based systems.

NeXT separated the underlying operating system from the application frameworks, producing OpenStep. OpenStep and its applications can run on multiple underlying operating systems, including OPENSTEP, Windows NT, and Solaris. In 1997, it was updated to 4.4BSD while assimilated into Apple's development of Rhapsody for x86 and Power Macintosh. NeXTSTEP's direct descendants are Apple's macOS, iOS, iPadOS, watchOS, and tvOS.

Legacy
The first web browser, WorldWideWeb, and the first app store were all invented on the NeXTSTEP platform.

Some features and keyboard shortcuts now common to web browsers originated in NeXTSTEP conventions. The basic layout options of HTML 1.0 and 2.0 are attributable to those features of NeXT's Text class.

Lighthouse Design Ltd. developed  Diagram!, a drawing tool, originally called BLT (for Box-and-Line Tool) in which objects (boxes) are connected together using "smart links" (lines) to construct diagrams such a flow charts. This basic design can be enhanced by the simple addition of new links and new documents, located anywhere in the local area network, that foreshadowed Tim Berners-Lee's initial prototype that was written on NeXTStep in October–December 1990.

In the 1990s, the pioneering PC games Doom, Doom II, Quake, and their respective level editors were developed by id Software on NeXT machines. Other games based on the Doom engine such as Heretic and its sequel Hexen by Raven Software, and Strife by Rogue Entertainment were developed on NeXT hardware using id's tools.

Altsys made the NeXTSTEP application Virtuoso, version 2 of which was ported to Mac OS and Windows to become Macromedia FreeHand version 4. The modern "Notebook" interface for Mathematica, and the advanced spreadsheet Lotus Improv, were developed using NeXTSTEP. The software that controlled MCI's Friends and Family calling plan program was developed using NeXTSTEP.

About the time of the release of NeXTSTEP 3.2, NeXT partnered with Sun Microsystems to develop OpenStep. It is the product of an effort to separate the underlying operating system from the higher-level object libraries to create a cross-platform object-oriented API standard derived from NeXTSTEP. OpenStep is hosted on multiple underlying operating systems, including NeXT's own OPENSTEP. It was released for Sun's Solaris, Windows NT, and NeXT's version of the Mach kernel. NeXT's implementation is called "OPENSTEP for Mach" and its first release (4.0) superseded NeXTSTEP 3.3 on NeXT, Sun, and Intel IA-32 systems.

Following an announcement on December 20, 1996, Apple Computer acquired NeXT on February 4, 1997, for $429 million. Based upon the "OPENSTEP for Mach" operating system, and developing the OPENSTEP API to become Cocoa, Apple created the basis of Mac OS X, and eventually of iOS, iPadOS, watchOS, and tvOS.

GNUstep is a free software implementation of the OpenStep standard.

Release history

Versions up to 4.1 are general releases. OPENSTEP 4.2 pre-release 2 is a bug-fix release published by Apple and supported for five years after its September 1997 release.

See also
 OpenStep, the object-oriented application programming interface derived from NeXTSTEP
 GNUstep, an open-source implementation of Cocoa API respectively OpenStep API
 Window Maker, a window manager designed to emulate the NeXT GUI for the X Window System
 Bundle (macOS)
 Miller Columns, the method of directory browsing that NeXTSTEP's File Viewer used
 Multi-architecture binary
 NeXT character set
 Previous, an emulator for NeXT hardware capable of running some versions of NeXTSTEP

References

External links
 
 NeXTComputers.org
 
 The Next Step BYTE Magazine 14-03, Object Oriented Programming with NextStep

1989 software
Berkeley Software Distribution
Discontinued operating systems
Mach (kernel)
NeXT
Object-oriented operating systems
Unix variants
Window-based operating systems